Backboard may refer to:

 Backboard (basketball), equipment used in basketball
 Backboard (tennis), wall located at a tennis court attached to a fence
 Spinal board, a medical device used for the immobilization and transportation of patients with suspected spinal injuries (aka backboard and long spine board)
 A term in the sport of curling meaning the border at the extreme ends of the playing area

See also
 Board (disambiguation)
 Blackboard (disambiguation)